Yelizaveta Aleksandrovna Yermolayeva (born 2 April 1930) is a former Soviet middle-distance runner.

Yermolayeva won the 800 metres at the 1957 World University Games in Paris, her first international success. She also won at the 1958 European Championships in Stockholm, beating Great Britain's Diane Leather in the championship record time of 2:06.3; Czechoslovakian sports statistician Jan Popper ranked her the world's best at the distance that year. Yermolayeva was one of the favorites for the 1960 Summer Olympics in Rome, but was unable to compete due to injuries.

References

1930 births
Living people
Soviet female middle-distance runners
People from Nizhny Novgorod Oblast
European Athletics Championships medalists
Athletes from Minsk